The Thurso River is a river in northern Fiordland, New Zealand. It rises west of Mount Pembroke and flows westward into the Tasman Sea north of Milford Sound.

See also
List of rivers of New Zealand

References

Rivers of Fiordland